Susan Hart (born June 2, 1941) is an American actress, and the widow of American International Pictures (AIP) co-founder James H. Nicholson.

Early years
Before she became an actress, Hart worked for a telephone company in Palm Springs, managed a dress shop in California, and sold clothes in Hawaii.

Career
She is best known for her appearances in four popular AIP films of the 1960s, The Ghost in the Invisible Bikini, Pajama Party, and the Vincent Price vehicles Dr. Goldfoot and the Bikini Machine and City Under the Sea, and two non-AIP movies, For Those Who Think Young and Ride the Wild Surf.

In 2003, a Golden Palm Star on the Palm Springs, California, Walk of Stars was dedicated to her.

Movies ownership
Hart now owns the rights to 11 movies made by her late husband's company: It Conquered the World (1956) and its 1966 remake Zontar, The Thing from Venus, Invasion of the Saucer Men (1957) and its 1965 remake The Eye Creatures, I Was a Teenage Frankenstein (1957), I Was a Teenage Werewolf (1957), The Amazing Colossal Man (1957), Terror from the Year 5000 (1958), Apache Woman (1955), The Oklahoma Woman (1956) and Naked Paradise (1957).

Television
In 1963 Hart appeared as a guest star on The Virginian in the episode "Echo of Another Day."   In 1968, she also appeared as Rhoda in Season 4 of The Wild Wild West, in the episode "The Night of the Fugitives" (The Wild Wild West, The Complete Series, DVD Set, CBS, 2016).

References

External links
 

1941 births
Living people
People from Wenatchee, Washington
American film actresses
21st-century American women